Samuel Sarkpa (born 26 July 1961) is a Liberian sprinter. He competed in the men's 400 metres at the 1984 Summer Olympics.

References

1961 births
Living people
Athletes (track and field) at the 1984 Summer Olympics
Liberian male sprinters
Olympic athletes of Liberia
Place of birth missing (living people)